The Silent Generation is the debut album by The Dimes, released on December 11, 2007 via the label Timber Carnival Records.

Track listing

"Jersey Kid" - 1:58
"Paul Kern Can't Sleep" - 3:15
"New York 1930" - 2:03
"Catch Me Jumping" - 3:06
"Battle of San Jacinto" - 4:15
"Chicago 1929" - 1:33
"Letters in the Sea" - 3:26
"Stacked Brown Boxes" - 3:21
"This Time" - 3:36
"Salt and Foam" - 3:11
"Emmy Divine" - 2:24
"Up for Air" - 3:25
"The Silent Generation" - 2:02

References

2007 albums
The Dimes albums